The Skawahlook First Nation, formerly the Tait Indian Band is a band government of the Sto:lo people whose reserves and communities are located in the Upper Fraser Valley region of British Columbia, Canada, near the community of Ruby Creek, which is at the eastern end of the District of Kent.  It is a member government of the Sto:lo Nation tribal council, one of two tribal councils of the Sto:lo.  Total registered population of the band is 75 people, 59 of them living off-reserve.

Indian Reserves
Indian Reserves under the jurisdiction of the Skawahlook First Nation are:
Pekw'Xe:yles (Peckquaylis) 10.30 ha. (in Mission, shared with 20 other bands)
Ruby Creek Indian Reserve No. 2, 16.60 ha.
Skawahlook Indian Reserve No. 1, 58.30 ha.

References

Sto:lo governments
First Nations governments in the Lower Mainland